The National Historic Lookout Register is a program administered by the United States Forest Service, the Forest Fire Lookout Association, the National Forestry Association, the National Woodland Owners Association, state forestry departments and Department of Interior agencies to recognize historic fire lookout towers in the United States. It was established in 1990.

Listings on the register

References

External links

Historic preservation
 
Heritage registers in the United States
Historic sites in the United States
1990 establishments in the United States